Trstené is a village and municipality in Liptovský Mikuláš District in the Žilina Region of northern Slovakia.

History
In historical records the village was first mentioned in 1269.

Geography
The municipality lies at an altitude of 639 metres and covers an area of 3.942 km². It has a population of about 205 people.

External links
http://www.statistics.sk/mosmis/eng/run.html

www.trstene.sk

Villages and municipalities in Liptovský Mikuláš District